Ernesto Gabriel Pizarro (born 12 April 1991 in La Rioja) is an Argentine racing cyclist who represents Argentina in BMX. He represented Argentina at the 2012 Summer Olympics in the men's BMX event, finishing in 24th place.

References

External links
 
 
 
 
 
 

1991 births
Living people
BMX riders
Argentine male cyclists
Olympic cyclists of Argentina
Cyclists at the 2012 Summer Olympics
Sportspeople from La Rioja Province, Argentina